The BMW 2 Series is a range of subcompact executive cars (C-segment) manufactured by BMW since 2014. The 2 Series was created when BMW spun-off the 2-door models (coupé and convertible) of the BMW 1 Series into a separate series.

The 2 Series was first launched as a 2-door coupé and convertible, both based on a rear-wheel drive platform. A year later, the Active Tourer 5-seat compact MPV body style was added, based on the unrelated front-wheel drive platform shared with the Mini Hatch (F55/56/57). This was followed by a 7-seat version called the Gran Tourer. In 2019, the Gran Coupé fastback sedan joined the 2 Series family as a front-wheel drive vehicle based on the 1 Series hatchback and has been marketed as a 4-door coupe. In 2021, BMW released the second-generation 2-door coupé, rear-wheel drive 2 Series in July 2021.

The BMW M2 is the high-performance version of the 2 Series 2-door coupé. The first generation of the M2 is the F87 coupé and is powered by turbocharged straight-six engines.



Coupé/convertible

First generation (F22/F23; 2014) 

The first-generation 2 Series is a rear-wheel-drive 2-door coupé (F22 model code), and 2-door convertible (F23 model code). This generation has been in production since November 2013 as the successor to the E82 1 Series coupé and E88 1 Series convertible. It is currently produced in Leipzig, previously alongside the F20 1 Series hatchback range.

The coupé version of the 2 Series is used as the basis of the high performance F87 M2 model. The model is powered by the BMW N55 and BMW S55 turbocharged inline-six engines.

Second generation (G42; 2021) 

The second-generation 2 Series coupé was revealed in July 2021 as the successor to the F22 2 Series coupé and convertible. Remaining a rear-wheel-drive-based model, the G42 is built on the CLAR platform with a roughly 50:50 weight distribution and shares many mechanical components and engine options with the G20 3 Series and G22 4 Series. Unlike its predecessor, the second-generation 2 Series coupé is no longer available with a manual transmission and not complemented with a convertible body style. The launch models consist of the mild hybrid diesel engine 220d, the petrol engine 220i and 230i and the top M240i xDrive. The G42 2 Series will be exclusively produced in BMW's San Luis Potosí plant in Mexico. The G42 is the first BMW vehicle designed by BMW of Mexico. Production of the G42 2 Series commenced on 2 September 2021.

Active Tourer/Gran Tourer 

The BMW 2 Series Active Tourer is a five-door, two-row compact MPV produced since 2014. The vehicle is built on the front-wheel drive-based UKL2 platform with an optional all-wheel drive (xDrive). It is the first BMW-branded model to not use the rear-wheel drive configuration. A longer version with three-row seating called the BMW 2 Series Gran Tourer was released shortly after in 2015.

Gran Coupé (F44; 2019) 

BMW revealed a four-door sedan variant under the 2 Series range in October 2019 as the BMW 2 Series Gran Coupé. It is built on the front-wheel drive UKL2 platform like the Active Tourer (F45) and Gran Tourer (F46). In markets where the vehicle is being sold, it is the smallest four-door sedan offered by BMW, except in China and Mexico where the smaller F52 1 Series sedan is offered.

References 

2 Series
Compact cars